Bindahara is a genus of butterflies in the family Lycaenidae. The species of this genus are found in the Indomalayan and Australasian realms.

Species
Bindahara phocides (Fabricius, 1793) - plane
Bindahara arfaki Bethune-Baker, 1913 New Guinea
Bindahara meeki (Rothschild & Jordan, 1905) New Guinea and Halmahera Island

References

Deudorigini
Lycaenidae genera
Taxa named by Frederic Moore